Grias cauliflora, the anchovy pear, (also called the river pear) is a fruit native to Jamaica, Central America, and Colombia. It is often found near rivers or marshes in large colonies. It grows on the evergreen tree Grias cauliflora of the Lecythidaceae (Brazil nut) family.

The edible nuts grow clumped together in large, round, woody and extremely hard seed pods the size of a large grapefruit. The meat of the seed (the "nut") is very rich in oil and grows from 7 to 9 cm long and 2 to 4 cm in diameter. The tree has fragrant yellow flowers about 5 cm across and grows to a height of about 15 m (50 feet). The anchovy pear tree bears spear-shaped, glossy leaves produced in palm-like tufts that reach an average length of 90 cm. The edible, brown, berrylike fruits for which it is cultivated for pickling are not related to the common pear. The fruit has a taste similar to that of the mango.

References

External links
Anchovy Pear Image
Grias cauliflora Images

Flora of Central America
Flora of Colombia
Flora of Jamaica
cauliflora
Plants described in 1759
Taxa named by Carl Linnaeus
Flora without expected TNC conservation status